The Last Mountain Railway  is a Canadian short line railway company and a subsidiary of Mobil Grain Ltd. LMR operates on trackage between Regina and Davidson in Saskatchewan, established in 2009.  The trackage was formerly operated by Canadian National, the LMR interlines with Canadian National in both Regina and Davidson.  This subdivision is part of the former Canadian National line that links Regina and Saskatoon. Freight railway stations along the line include Davidson, Girvin, Craik, Aylesbury, Chamberlain, Findlater, Bethune, Disley, Lumsden, Condie and Regina. All locomotives used on LMR are owned by Mobil Grain (MGLX) and also utilized on their sister company, Big Sky Rail Corp.

Locomotive roster

See also

Qu'Appelle, Long Lake and Saskatchewan Railroad and Steamboat Company

References

Saskatchewan railways
Railway companies established in 2009
2009 establishments in Canada